The fifth season of the reality television show Storage Wars aired on A&E from March 18, 2014 to September 30, 2014, with one episode held for airing during the sixth season on November 18, 2014. The season included 29 regular episodes and six new compilation episodes.

Beginning this season, "The Collector" Barry Weiss is no longer with the show that we was departing for four seasons, having been spun off into his own series, Barry'd Treasure. However, Barry was mentioned in the episode "Grin And Barry It". Ivy Calvin and the husband-and-wife team of Rene and Casey Nezhoda joined the regular cast in this season, both of whom made multiple appearances in Season 4. Jarrod Shultz and Brandi Passante, Darrell and Brandon Sheets, and auctioneers Dan and Laura Dotson returned Season 5. Nezhoda and Lloyd did not appear in the final nine episodes of the season, allowing by Mary Padian for episodes 25-29 and the long-awaited return of Dave Hester in episodes 25-29 after one-season hiatus.

Episode overview
{|class="wikitable plainrowheaders" style="width:100%; margin:auto; background:#fff;"
|-
!  style="width:10%; background:#FFA54F; color:#fff;"|No. inseries 
!  style="width:10%; background:#FFA54F; color:#fff;"|No. inseason 
!  style="width:40%; background:#FFA54F; color:#fff;"|Title
!  style="width:20%; background:#FFA54F; color:#fff;"|Location
!  style="width:20%; background:#FFA54F; color:#fff;"|Original air date
!  style="width:10%; background:#FFA54F; color:#fff;"|U.S. viewers(millions)
|-

|}

Episode statistics
Although revealed at the end of the episode, the totals are not always reflective and exact of the value of items in the lockers. In many cases, the values of items are estimates made on the spot by the cast members, and are not necessarily actual profits or losses. Some of the episodes were not aired in the order that they were filmed. Therefore, the * column in each season's episode list indicates the sequential order of that episode.

Notes

 1 In "Flight of the Gambler", Jarrod and Brandi bought four lockers. Rene and Casey did not buy a locker, but lost money due to the price of gas and labor to bring the truck up from San Diego.
 2 In "Flight of the Gambler", Darrell would have earned an extra $2,000 in profit from a model plane they found in their unit, but Brandon crashed the plane in a test flight, making it worthless.
 3 In "Operation: Intimidation", Jarrod & Brandi spent $3,400 on the unit and an extra $1,000 to repair their truck after hitting a tree.
 4 In "Return of the King of Montebello", Rene and Casey spent $725 on their locker and had to pay $400 more for hitting a fence in a previous episode. Rene could have earned an extra $300 for a dance pole in the unit, but decided to keep it.
 5 In "Nuthin' But A 'G' Thang, Rene", Darrell won a coin flip from Rene for $1,000. This is reflected in Rene's spending and Darrell's profit.
 6 In "Zen Masters Of The Universe", Rene and Casey bought three lockers.
 7 In "The Donut Effect", Jarrod and Brandi bought two lockers and their profit represents the take from the fourth anniversary sale at their store, since almost nothing of value was in either unit.
 8 In "The Donut Effect", Darrell and Brandon did not buy a locker but had previously purchased KISS masks appraised.
 9 In "The Gutfather", Darrell and Brandon spent $700 on their locker and paid an additional $375 to have the pool table from the unit set up by professionals.
 10 In "The Mom Factor", Ivy bought three lockers and his profit represents the take from the auction held at his store.
 11 In "The Man in Black is Back... in Black!", Jarrod and Brandi bought three lockers. Dave Hester was kicked out of the auction before he could buy a locker.
 12 In  "Deep in the Heart of Upland", Dave Hester did not appear.
 13 In "The Daneurysm", Ron Scheenstra fills in for Dan and Laura as auctioneer. Dave Hester did not appear in this episode.
 14 In, "The Education of Miss Profit", Dave Hester did not appear.
 15 In, "Bid Strong and Prosper", Mary Padian did not appear.
 16 In, "Hestered in the Highlands", Mary Padian did not appear.
 Rene Nezhoda and Casey Lloyd did not appear in episodes 21-29.

References

External links
 Storage Wars Zap2it Episode List
 The Futon Critic Shows A-Z: Storage Wars

Season 5